The Civil Aviation Authority of New Zealand (CAA; Māori: Te Mana Rererangi Tūmatanui o Aotearoa) is the government agency tasked with establishing civil aviation safety and security standards in New Zealand.
The CAA also monitors adherence to those standards and is responsible for enforcement proceedings.
The authority "investigates and reviews accident and incident investigations in its capacity as the responsible safety and security authority, subject to the limitations set out in section 14(3) of the Transport Accident Investigation Commission Act 1990" (TAIC).
CAA is also responsible for managing civilian pilot, aerodrome and aircraft licensing in New Zealand. The CAA has its headquarters in the Asteron Centre in Featherston Street, Wellington.

Ministers of Civil Aviation
Before a Civil Aviation portfolio was created in 1946, ministerial authority had rested with the Minister of Defence. The position of Minister for Civil Aviation was abolished just before the 1990 election where after aviation remained under the Minister of Transport. However the government formed the Civil Aviation Authority in 1992 to regulate aviation separately from the Ministry of Transport. It was reinstated as a full ministerial portfolio in 1999.

The following ministers have held ministerial responsibility for Civil Aviation.

Key

See also

 Airways New Zealand
 Gliding New Zealand
 History of aviation in New Zealand

Notes

References

External links 
 CAA Website

1992 establishments in New Zealand
Aviation organisations based in New Zealand
New Zealand
Government agencies established in 1992
New Zealand Crown agents
Organizations investigating aviation accidents and incidents
Civil aviation in New Zealand